Diego Nicolás Fernández Castro (born 8 March 1998) is a Chilean footballer who plays for O'Higgins.

References

1998 births
Living people
Chilean footballers
Chilean Primera División players
Association football midfielders